Burton's gerbil (Gerbillus burtoni) is distributed mainly in Darfur, Sudan.  Less than 250 individuals of this species of rodent are thought to persist in the wild. It may have been named after Edward Burton, who had the gerbil in his menagerie, obtained from Darfur and described by Frédéric Cuvier.

References

  Database entry includes a brief justification of why this species is listed as data deficient

Gerbillus
Rodents of Africa
Mammals described in 1838
Taxa named by Frédéric Cuvier